Kanjari (also known as Kangar Bhat, Kangri, Kuchbandhi or "the Gypsy language") is an unclassified Indic tribal language of India associated with the Kanjar tribe. It is written using the Devanagari script. Kanjari is spoken in Andhra Pradesh, Madhya Pradesh, Uttar Pradesh and Rajasthan. It may be one of the Punjabi languages. UNESCO classifies Kanjari as an endangered language.

Syntax

George Abraham Grierson noted several grammatical features for Kanjari in the first Linguistic Survey of India:

 The final "ō" of adjectives is usually kept before an inflected noun, which suggests that adjectives are not inflected and that gender is weak. For example, tēro naukrī ("thy service").
 Some pronouns are similar to Rajasthani languages, such as the demonstrative pronouns jō and jī. However, other pronouns are similar to the Dravidian languages, such as ūr ("he") compared to Tamil īr and Gondi ōr.
 Overall, verb conjugations and words "broadly agree" with the patterns of Eastern Rajasthani languages, but some characteristics point to a "certain Dravidian element" being present in Kanjari.

Vocabulary

References

Indo-Aryan languages